East Bengal Football Club is an Indian association football club based in Kolkata, West Bengal, which competes in the top tier of Indian football. The club was formed when the vice-president of Jorabagan, Suresh Chandra Chaudhuri, resigned when Jorabagan sent out their starting eleven but with the notable exclusion of defender Sailesh Bose who was dropped from the squad for reasons not disclosed when they were about to face Mohun Bagan in the Coochbehar Cup Semi-Final on 28 July 1920. He along with Raja Manmatha Nath Chaudhuri, Ramesh Chandra Sen, and Aurobinda Ghosh, formed East Bengal, in the Jorabagan home of Suresh Chandra on 1 August 1920; 99 years ago. East Bengal started playing in the Calcutta Football League 2nd division from 1921 and in 1925 they qualified for the first division for the first time and since then they have won numerous titles in Indian Football.

East Bengal joined the National Football League since its inception in 1996 and is the only club to play all seasons till date, even after its name change to I-League in 2007. East Bengal has won the National Football League thrice: 2000–01, 2002–03, and 2003–04 and became runners-up 7 times, the most number of times by any Indian football club. Among other trophies, East Bengal has won the Calcutta Football League 39 times, IFA Shield 28 times, Federation Cup 8 times, and the Durand Cup 16 times. Since its establishment in 1920, East Bengal has won several trophies, both in the domestic as well as in international arena and its record against foreign opponents has been impressive.

This chronological list comprises all the matches played by East Bengal Club against foreign opposition in all competitive and non-competitive fixtures since their foundation in 1920. Each entry includes the name of the tournament, the stage at which the fixture was played, the date of the match, the name and nationality of the opponent team, the match result, the scorers for East Bengal, the venue, and the city at which the game was played.

List of all matches against foreign opponents

Overall record as per tournament

{| class="wikitable" style="font-size:90%; width:60%; text-align:center"
|-
|Colspan="9"|East Bengal Club overall record against foreign opponents
|-
!width="20%"|Tournament
!width="5%"|
!width="5%"|
!width="5%"|
!width="5%"|
!width="5%"|
!width="5%"|
!width="5%"|
!width="5%"|
|-
|align=left| Asian Club Championship |
|-
|align=left| Asian Cup Winners' Cup |
|-
|align=left| AFC Cup |
|-
!align=left| AFC Tournaments Total |
|-
|align=left| All Airlines Gold Cup |
|-
|align=left| ASEAN Club Championship |
|-
|align=left| Bangabandhu Cup |
|-
|align=left| Bordoloi Trophy |
|-
|align=left| BTC Club Cup |
|-
|align=left| BTV Becamex IDC Cup |
|-
|align=left| Charms Cup |
|-
|align=left| Coca-Cola Cup |
|-
|align=left| Darjeeling Gold Cup |
|-
|align=left| DCM Trophy |
|-
|align=left| Durand Cup |
|-
|align=left| Governor's Gold Cup |
|-
|align=left| IFA Shield |
|-
|align=left| JC Guha Trophy |
|-
|align=left| Mohun Bagan Centenary Cup |
|-
|align=left| Nehru Centenary Club Cup |
|-
|align=left| P. K. Nair Gold Cup |
|-
|align=left| Pepsi Max Challenge Cup |
|-
|align=left| Rovers Cup |
|-
|align=left| San Miguel Cup |
|-
|align=left| Scissors Cup |
|-
|align=left| Sheikh Kamal Cup |
|-
|align=left| Stafford Cup |
|-
|align=left| Tea Planters' Association Trophy |
|-
|align=left| Wai Wai Cup |
|-
|align=left| World Youth Festival |
|-
!align=left| Total in competitive matches |
|-
|align=left| Friendlies |
|-
!align=left| Total |

Overall record as per nationalities

{| class="wikitable" style="font-size:90%; width:55%; text-align:center"
|-
|Colspan="9"|East Bengal Club overall record against clubs from different nationalities
|-
!width="15%"|Nationality
!width="5%"|
!width="5%"|
!width="5%"|
!width="5%"|
!width="5%"|
!width="5%"|
!width="5%"|
!width="5%"|
|-
| align=left|  Armenian SSR |
|-
| align=left|  Australia |
|-
| align=left|  Austria |
|-
| align=left|  Bahrain |
|-
| align=left|  Bangladesh |
|-
| align=left|  Bhutan |
|-
| align=left|  Brazil |
|-
| align=left|  Cameroon |
|-
| align=left|  China |
|-
| align=left|  Denmark |
|-
| align=left|  England |
|-
| align=left|  Germany |
|-
| align=left|  Hong Kong |
|-
| align=left|  Hungary |
|-
| align=left|  Indonesia |
|-
| align=left|  Iran |
|-
| align=left|  Iraq |
|-
| align=left|  Japan |
|-
| align=left|  Jordan |
|-
| align=left|  Kazakhstan |
|-
| align=left|  Kuwait |
|-
| align=left|  Lebanon |
|-
| align=left|  Malaysia |
|-
| align=left|  Maldives |
|-
| align=left|  Myanmar |
|-
| align=left|  Nepal |
|-
| align=left|  Nigeria |
|-
| align=left|  North Korea |
|-
| align=left|  Oman |
|-
| align=left|  Pakistan |
|-
| align=left|  Paraguay |
|-
| align=left|  Philippines |
|-
| align=left|  Portugal |
|-
| align=left|  Romania |
|-
| align=left|  Saudi Arabia |
|-
| align=left|  Singapore |
|-
| align=left|  South Africa |
|-
| align=left|  South Korea |
|-
| align=left|  Soviet Union |
|-
| align=left|  Sri Lanka |
|-
| align=left|  Sweden |
|-
| align=left|  Syria |
|-
| align=left|  Thailand |
|-
| align=left|  Turkmenistan |
|-
| align=left|  Ukrainian SSR |
|-
| align=left|  Uruguay |
|-
| align=left|  USSR |
|-
| align=left|  Uzbek SSR |
|-
| align=left|  Vietnam |
|-
| align=left|  Yemen |
|-
! Total |

See also
East Bengal Club in international football

Bibliography
 Books

References

External links
 Official website

East Bengal Club related lists